Manuscriptology is another word for codicology, namely the study of history and literature through the use of hand-written documents. 

The term is in use particularly among scholars of South Asian cultural history because many South Asian manuscripts are not codices in the strict sense of the word.  That is to say, South Asian manuscripts are typically written on unbound sheets of paper or palm leaves, in a landscape format.  Vellum or parchment - typical writing material used in the European codex - are not used in India since the introduction of leather - the material used for vellum or parchment - are considered impure in Indian traditions  

There are exceptions.  The codex format is used for manuscripts in Kashmir, for example, where the concept of the manuscript book was influenced from European models transmitted by Islamic culture.

See also
 Palaeography
 Philology

References

External links
 http://www.tamilheritage.org/manulogy/palmgy.html
 http://www.thehindu.com/news/states/karnataka/44day-workshop-on-manuscriptology-and-palaeography-begins/article305105.ece
 https://web.archive.org/web/20110226230151/http://www.tamiluniversity.ac.in/english/links/studies.html

Archaeological sub-disciplines
Codicology